Salvatore Todisco (August 30, 1961 in Naples – November 25, 1990) was a light flyweight boxer from Italy, who won the silver medal in the light flyweight division (– 48 kg) at the 1984 Summer Olympics in Los Angeles, California. In the final he was defeated by Paul Gonzales of the United States. He died in a car accident on November 25, 1990 at the age of 29.

1984 Olympic results 
Below are the Olympic results of Salvatore Todisco, an Italian light flyweight boxer who competed at the 1984 Los Angeles Olympics:

 Round of 32: bye
 Round of 16: Defeated Gerard Hawkins (Ireland) by decision, 5-0
 Quarterfinal: Defeated Rafael Ramos (Puerto Rico) by decision, 4-1
 Semifinal: Defeated Keith Mwila (Zambia) by decision, 5-0
 Final: Lost to Paul Gonzales (United States) by walkover (was awarded the silver medal)

References

External links
 
 

1961 births
1990 deaths
Boxers from Naples
Flyweight boxers
Boxers at the 1984 Summer Olympics
Olympic boxers of Italy
Olympic silver medalists for Italy
Olympic medalists in boxing
Italian male boxers
Road incident deaths in Italy
Medalists at the 1984 Summer Olympics
Competitors at the 1983 Mediterranean Games
Competitors at the 1987 Mediterranean Games
Mediterranean Games bronze medalists for Italy
Mediterranean Games medalists in boxing